The Fontaine Bartholdi is a fountain sculpted by Frédéric Auguste Bartholdi and realised in 1889 by Gaget & Gautier. It was erected at the Place des Terreaux, in the 1st arrondissement of Lyon, in September 1892.

History
On 20 April 1857, the Bordeaux city council decided to hold a competition to create a fountain for Place Quinconces. Frédéric Bartholdi, then aged 23, won the contest. However, the city hall of Bordeaux decided not to carry out his project. After Bartholdi had made the Statue of Liberty in New York in 1886, the mayor of Bordeaux contacted him, but his new project was canceled after much hesitation. It was finally achieved in 1888, but it was deemed as too expensive and therefore was sold to Lyon. It was unveiled as part of the Exposition Universelle (1889). The fountain was eventually put at the Place des Terreaux and is currently still there.

The fountain depicts France as a female (Marianne) seated on a chariot controlling the four great rivers of France, represented by wildly rearing and plunging horses, highly individualized but symmetrically arranged, with bridles and reins of water weeds. The fountain weighs 21 tons and is made of lead supported by a frame of iron and was presented at the Exposition Universelle of 1889. It has been classified as monument historique since 29 September 1995.

1892: First inauguration on Place des Terreaux  

1995: "Historic monument" classification after its relocation opposite the Fine Arts Museum

June 2016: start of the restoration work

March 2018: inauguration of the restored, re-watered and lit fountain

Total budget for the restoration: 3.58 million euros (including a one million euro contribution from the State)

Restoration
The fountain was removed temporarily in 2015 for restoration and was returned in December 2017, for a total budget of 2 750 000  euros. The structure was rusted, and the lead statue warped and fractured.

Gallery

See also 
 List of tallest statues

References

External links

Fontaine Bartholdi at Lyon's city webpage

Fountains in France
Sculptures in France
Buildings and structures in Lyon
1st arrondissement of Lyon
Lead sculptures
Monuments and memorials in France
1889 sculptures
Tourist attractions in Lyon
Monuments historiques of Lyon
Sculptures by Frédéric Auguste Bartholdi
Horses in art
Exposition Universelle (1889)
World's fair sculptures